A noble is a member of the nobility.

Noble may also refer to:

Places

Antarctica 
 Noble Glacier, King George Island
 Noble Nunatak, Marie Byrd Land
 Noble Peak, Wiencke Island
 Noble Rocks, Graham Land

Australia 
 Noble Island, Great Barrier Reef

United States 
 Noble (SEPTA station), a railway station in Abington, Pennsylvania
 Noble, Illinois, a village
 Noble, Indiana, an unincorporated community
 Noble, Iowa, an unincorporated community
 Noble, Louisiana, a village
 Noble, Missouri, an unincorporated community
 Noble, Oklahoma, a city
 Noble County (disambiguation)
 Noble Township (disambiguation)

People 
 Noble (given name)
 Noble (surname)

Animals 
 Noble (horse), a British Thoroughbred
 Noble Decree, an American-bred British-trained Thoroughbred racehorse
 Noble snipe, a small stocky wader
 Vaguely Noble, an Irish-bred Thoroughbred racehorse

Arts, entertainment, and media

Characters
 Noble, the humanoid werewolf form of Savage/Noble, the only fully organic Transformer, from the Beast Machines series
 Noble Kale, a Marvel Comics character
 Donna Noble, a companion in the sci-fi series Doctor Who 
 Geoff and Sylvia Noble, the parents of the companion Donna Noble, in the sci-fi series Doctor Who
 NOBLE team, a UNSC special warfare unit composed of Spartans, biochemically augmented supersoldiers that appear in Halo: Reach
 The Noble Family, a family of comic book superheroes in the series Noble Causes

Films
 Noble (film), a 2014 Irish film
 Noble Aspirations, a 2016 Chinese film
 Noble Savage (film), a 2018 Israeli drama film

Music

Groups and labels
 Noble (record label), a Japanese record label founded in 2001
 Noble Street Studios, a recording studio

Albums
 Noble (album), the debut album by Versailles
 Noble Justice, the debut studio album by Young Noble
 Noble Live, a 2010 live album by Versailles
 Noble Savage (album), a 1985 studio album by Virgin Steele

Songs
"Noble Savage", a song on the Virgin Steele album Noble Savage
 "Noble Surfer", a song from Surfin' U.S.A. by the Beach Boys

Other uses in arts, entertainment, and media
 Noble, My Love, a 2015 South Korean web drama 
 Noble savage, a literary stock character
 Noble Warriors, a fantasy series, trilogy

Chemistry 
 Noble gas (data page)
 Noble gas
 Noble metal

Coins 
 Noble (English coin), a medieval gold coin
 Noble (Manx coin), a platinum bullion coin

Companies 
 Noble (company), a production studio based in Los Angeles, California
 Noble Air, a defunct Turkish airline
 Noble Automotive, a British automobile manufacturer
 Noble Brothers Foundry, an ironworks manufacturer based in Rome, Georgia, United States
 Noble Corporation, a Cayman Islands company providing offshore drilling rigs and platforms
 Noble Energy, an English company engaged in the exploration for and production of petroleum and natural gas
 Noble Group, a Hong Kong-based trading firm
 Noble Systems Corporation, a privately held company which develops call center technology
 Nobleworks, a publisher of greeting cards

Court Cases 
 Noble v Alley
 Noble Investments Ltd v Keenan
 Noble siblings case

Schools 
 Noble High School (disambiguation)
 Noble Network of Charter Schools, a public charter high school in Chicago

Ships 
 HNLMS Van Galen (G84), a 1941 Royal Netherlands Navy World War II destroyer originally built as HMS Noble (G84)
 , two ships

Vehicles 
 Noble M10
 Noble M12
 Noble M14
 Noble M15
 Noble M400
 Noble M600

Other uses 
 Golden Noble, an old English cultivar of the domesticated apple
 National Organization of Black Law Enforcement Executives, or NOBLE
 Noble baronets, three titles in the Baronetage of the United Kingdom
 Noble polyhedron, a polyhedron which is isohedral and isogonal 
 North of Boston Library Exchange, or NOBLE, a cooperative effort of 28 libraries

See also 
 Nobel (disambiguation)
 Justice Noble (disambiguation)
 Nobles (disambiguation)